Carex toyoshimae is a species of sedge native to Japan.

References 

toyoshimae
Flora of Japan